Kotlai is a small town in the Swat District of Pakistan, roughly  from Islamabad.

A small highway leads to Kotlai from Shamozai's main road at Akhun Kalai. The village is surrounded on three sides by the Hindu Kush mountains. It is surrounded by the villages of Melaga, Zora, Dero, and Akhun Kalai. Small villages in and around Kotlai include Kargal, Nwartangai, Tarkashai, Dherai, Shago, Warsak, Chenar Tangai, Paindasha, and Sorazghai. The Mashghulgai river runs through Kotlai.

The town has a high school and a small hospital. Most of its inhabitants work in agriculture and gardening. The Learning Village School Kotlai is a private school in Kotlai village.

References

 Populated places in Swat District